The Governor of the National Bank of Romania (Guvernatorul Băncii Naționale a României) is the head of the National Bank of Romania, being also the president of the Council of Administration of the Bank. The governor is named at the same time as the Council of Administration by the Parliament in a joint session of the Senate and the Chamber of Deputies for a five-year term.

The current Council of Administration was voted (named) on 6 October 2009. The current governor is Mugur Isărescu, the longest continuous serving Governor, with a one-year interruption between December 1999 and December 2000, when he served as Prime Minister. During his premiership the office was held ad interim by Emil Iota Ghizari.

Council of Administration 

The Council of Administration of the National Bank of Romania is composed by 9 members appointed by the Parliament of Romania, for a five-year term.

The current Council of Administration of the National Bank of Romania was appointed by the Decision No. 35/9 October 2009 of the Parliament of Romania:

 Governor - Mugur Isărescu
 First-Deputy-Governor - vacant Florin Georgescu is suspended from the council of Administration of the National Bank for as long as he holds the office of Deputy Prime-Minister, Minister of Public Finance
 Deputy-Governor - Bogdan Olteanu
 Deputy-Governor - Cristian Popa
 Member - Marin Dinu
 Member - Nicolae Dănilă
 Member - Virgiliu Stoenescu
 Member - Agnes Nagy
 Member - Napoleon Pop

List of governors

References

External links 
 Timeline of Governors on the National Bank of Romania website
 Leadership of the Bank
 The Council of Administration

National Bank of Romania
Romania